Pasquier Quesnel, CO (14 July 1634 – 2 December 1719) was a French Jansenist theologian.

Life 
Quesnel was born in Paris, and, after graduating from the Sorbonne with distinction in 1653, he joined the French Oratory in 1657. There he soon became prominent; he took a leading part in scholarly controversy, for example against Joseph Anthelmi.

His Jansenist sympathies led to his banishment from Paris in 1681, following the formulary controversy. He took refuge with the friendly Cardinal Coislin, bishop of Orléans; four years later, however, foreseeing that a fresh storm of persecution was about to burst, he fled to Brussels, and took up his abode with Antoine Arnauld.

There he remained till 1703, when he was arrested by order of the archbishop of Mechelen. After three months imprisonment he made a highly dramatic escape, and settled at Amsterdam, where he spent the remainder of his life. After Antoine Arnauld's death in 1694 Quesnel was generally regarded as the leader of the Jansenist party; and his Réflexions morales sur le Nouveau Testament played almost as large a part in its literature as Jansen's Augustinus itself.

As its title betokens, Quesnel's book was a devotional commentary on the New Testament, wherein Quesnel managed to explain the aims and ideals of the Jansenist party better than any earlier writer had done; and it accordingly became the chief object of Jesuit attack. It appeared in many forms and under various titles, the original germ going back so far as 1668; the first complete edition was published in 1692. The papal bull Unigenitus, in which no fewer than 101 sentences from the Réflexions morales were condemned as heretical, was obtained from Clement XI on 8 September 1713. Quesnel died at Amsterdam in 1719.

Unigenitus marked the end of Catholic toleration of Jansenist doctrine.  The bull Unigenitus, dated 8 September 1713, was produced with the contribution of Gregorio Selleri, a lector at the College of Saint Thomas, the future Pontifical University of Saint Thomas Aquinas, Angelicum, fostered the condemnation of Jansenism by condemning 101 propositions from the Réflexions morales of Quesnel as heretical, and as identical with propositions already condemned in the writings of Jansen.

Notes

References

External links 
 

1634 births
1719 deaths
French Oratory
University of Paris alumni
Jansenists
17th-century French Catholic theologians